TMH Polonia Bytom is a professional ice hockey team in Bytom, Poland. They play in the Polska Hokej Liga, the highest level of ice hockey in Poland.

History
The sports society was created in 1920, with the ice hockey club being founded in 1946. Polonia won six Polska Liga Hokejowa titles in the 1980s and 1990s, and three Polish 1. Liga titles in the 1980s and 2000s.

Players

  Mateusz Kolodziej 

  Dominik Kraus 

  Mateusz Studzinski 

  Bartosz Trawinski 

  Tomasz Zdanowicz

  Aleksander Bodora 

  Matej Cunik 

  Mateusz Dworazny

  Aleksandrs Gallons 

  Kacper Kamieniecki 

  Grigorii Stavisskii 

  Bartlomiej Stepien 

  David Turon

Achievements
Polish champion : 1984, 1986, 1988, 1989, 1990, 1991.
Polish 1. Liga champion : 1981, 2000, 2007.

External links
Official website

Ice hockey teams in Poland
Sport in Bytom
Ice hockey clubs established in 1920